Arzal is a commune in the Morbihan department in the  Brittany region in northwestern France.

Population
Inhabitants of Arzal are called Arzalais.

See also
Communes of the Morbihan department

References

External links

  
 
Mayors of Morbihan Association 

Communes of Morbihan